The 1961 NCAA Division I Men's Golf Championship was the 23rd annual tournament to determine the national champions of NCAA Division I men's collegiate golf. 

It was contested in 1961 at the Purdue University Golf Course in Lafayette, Indiana. 

Host team Purdue won the team title and Jack Nicklaus from Ohio State won the individual title over Purdue's Mark Darnell.

Team competition

Leaderboard

References

NCAA Men's Golf Championship
Golf in Indiana
NCAA Golf Championship
NCAA Golf Championship
NCAA Golf Championship